NGC 4634 is an edge-on barred spiral galaxy located about 70 million light-years away in the constellation of Coma Berenices. NGC 4634 was discovered by astronomer William Herschel on January 14, 1787. It is interacting with the spiral  galaxy NGC 4633. Both galaxies are members of the Virgo Cluster.

Gallery

References

External links 
 

Barred spiral galaxies
Interacting galaxies
Coma Berenices
Virgo Cluster
4634
7875
42707